Andrey Yevgenyevich Lunyov (born 13 November 1991) is a Russian professional footballer who plays as a goalkeeper for Bundesliga club Bayer Leverkusen and the Russia national team.

Club career

FC Ufa
On 29 July 2015, it was confirmed that Lunyov would be joining FC Ufa on a 1-year contract. He made his Russian Premier League debut for Ufa on 11 September 2016 in a game against FC Krasnodar.

Zenit
On 23 December 2016, Lunyov moved to FC Zenit Saint Petersburg, signing a 4.5-year contract with the club.

Bayer Leverkusen
On 10 July 2021, he signed a two-year contract with Bayer Leverkusen.

International career

He made his debut for the Russia national football team on 10 October 2017 in a friendly game against Iran.

On 11 May 2018, he was included in Russia's extended 2018 FIFA World Cup squad. On 3 June 2018, he was included in the finalized World Cup squad. He remained on the bench in all the games behind Igor Akinfeev.

On 11 May 2021, he was included in the preliminary extended 30-man squad for UEFA Euro 2020. He was not included in the final squad.

Career statistics

Club

International

Honours
Zenit Saint Petersburg
 Russian Premier League: 2018–19, 2019–20, 2020–21
 Russian Cup: 2019–20

References

External links

1991 births
Footballers from Moscow
Living people
Russian footballers
Association football goalkeepers
FC Torpedo Moscow players
FC Saturn Ramenskoye players
FC Ufa players
Russian Premier League players
Russian First League players
FC Zenit Saint Petersburg players
Bundesliga players
Bayer 04 Leverkusen players
Russia international footballers
2018 FIFA World Cup players
Russian expatriate footballers
Expatriate footballers in Germany